Saint-Maulvis is a commune in the Somme department in Hauts-de-France in northern France.

Geography

Population

History
An important headquarters of the Order of Saint John existed here as early as 1179.  The commander was also seigneur of this and a further 21 communes and there exercised ‘all justice’. 
At the time of the Hundred Years War, in 1350, the village was totally burned down, except for the fortress sheltering  the men-at-arms. The village was uninhabited for 16 years.  From that time, the income of the commanderie was greatly reduced, so that the Grand Prior of France, Guillaume de Mailloc, summoned a general chapter at Paris in 1357.

See also
Communes of the Somme department

References

Communes of Somme (department)